Thanuja Ananthan (born 31 August 1985) is a Malaysian model and beauty pageant titleholder who was crowned as Miss World Malaysia 2009 and represented her country at the Miss World 2009.

Career

Miss World Malaysia 2009
Ananthan was crowned as Miss World Malaysia 2009 by the outgoing Miss World Malaysia 2008, Soo Wincci. Eighteen contestants vied for the crown.

Miss World 2009
Anathan represented Malaysia at the Miss World 2009 which was held at Johannasburg, South Africa. She competes with 120 delegates from around the world.

Achievements in the Miss World 2009 

 Miss world Top Model (Top 12): The first Miss Malaysia to be a finalist in this category.
 Miss World Beach Beauty (Top 40)
 Miss World Beauty With A purpose (Top 20): The first Miss Malaysia to make it into the top 20 for this category with her video of her passion & involvement in START Foundation.

Acting Career 
Thanuja is also active in acting. She started her professional acting career through the crime thriller Temuan Takdir which was released on 11 August 2016. She later acted with Remy Ishak and Elvis Chin in the six-episode patriotic drama, Anak Merdeka, which aired on all Astro channels from 26 to 31 August 2017; Thanuja plays the role of Devi. She became the main star alongside Kilafairy, Erwin Dawson, Cristina Suzanne and Hefny Sahad in the mystery drama series, Nafas on ntv7 where she played the role of Trisya.

Filmography 

 MasterChef Selebriti Malaysia (2012)
 Temuan Takdir (2016)
 Anak Merdeka (2017)
 Best in Town (2017)
 Festival Filem Malaysia ke-29 (2017)
 Nafas (2018)
 DM Hati Awak (2018)
 All Together Now Malaysia (2021–2023)
 Murder By Moonlight (2022)

References

External Links 

 
 
 
 

1985 births
Living people
People from Kuala Lumpur
Malaysian people of Indian descent
Malaysian beauty pageant winners
Miss World 2009 delegates